This article handles the Continental automobile built in New Haven, Connecticut, from 1907-1908. For other Continental automobiles refer to the List of U.S. cars.

This Continental car was built by the University Automobile Company located in New Haven. It was renamed the 
Continental Automobile Manufacturing Company in 1908. Chief engineer was C. S. Johnson. There is no known connection with other Continental automobiles.

The New Haven-built Continentals had front-mounted four cylinder engines. Pictures indicate that power was brought to the rear wheels by a pair of chains. These cars are easily recognizable by their perfectly round radiator and barrel-shaped hood. There was a large script reading "Continental" and "New Haven" in the underlining.

The model line-up for 1907-08 was as follows:

There were other methods of measuring the power of an automobile back in those years. Often, A.L.A.M. horsepower was designated which does not correspond with modern bhp or kW.

A Continental runabout driven by Johnson at the Yale University Automobile Club spring 1907 meet did a mile in a minute. Three Continentals participated in the 1907 Glidden Tour, C.S. Johnson among them. He did not finish the tour as he was arrested for speeding and the collision with a trolley in Dayton (Ohio).

Sources 
 Kimes, Beverly Rae (editor) and Clark, Henry Austin, jr. ;”The Standard Catalogue of American Cars”, 2. edition, Krause Publications, Iola WI 54990, USA (1985), p. 357

Defunct motor vehicle manufacturers of the United States
Luxury motor vehicle manufacturers
Defunct manufacturing companies based in Connecticut
Vehicle manufacturing companies established in 1907